Bowtell is a surname, and may refer to:

 Alby Bowtell (1887–1948), Australian rules footballer
 Amy Bowtell (born 1993), Irish tennis player
 Ann Bowtell (born 1938), British Civil Service Commissioner
 John Bowtell (1753–1813), English topographer
 Lyn Bowtell, Australian singer-songwriter
 Samuel Bowtell (1806–1881), English cricketer
 Steve Bowtell (born 1950), English football goalkeeper
 Wally Bowtell (1895–1975), Australian rules footballer